is the second single by Miho Komatsu and her first single released under the Amemura-O-Town Record label. The single reached #20 on the charts in its first week and sold 19,380 copies. It charted for five weeks total and sold 47,850 copies.

Track listing

Usage in media
Kagayakeru Hoshi
for anime television series Ninpen Manmaru as ending theme song

References 

1997 singles
Anime songs
Miho Komatsu songs
Songs written by Miho Komatsu
1997 songs
Being Inc. singles
Amemura-O-Town Record singles
Song recordings produced by Daiko Nagato